José María Garza Galán (November 6, 1846 in Múzquiz, Coahuila – October 7, 1902 in Monterrey, Nuevo León) was a Mexican politician. Governor of Coahuila in 1885–1889, which gave tax exemption to the first Spinning and Weaving Factory Torreon "La Constancia".

Life 
He was governor of the northern state of Coahuila during the presidency of Porfirio Díaz. Garza Galán, native of Múzquiz, wanted to be again governor in 1893, but there were protests. Eventually, Porfirio Díaz asked Garza Galán to withdraw his candidacy.

Politician 
Porfirista politician. He fought the Apaches to their extermination. He was elected governor of Coahuila in 1885. harassed the mayor of Cuatro Cienegas, Venustiano Carranza, to force him to resign. When he tried to reelect, the powerful families Madero and Carranza led a rebellion that ended with the intervention of Bernardo Reyes, who as representative of Porfirio Díaz deposed Garza Galan (1890).

Sources
Biografia del poder by Enrique Krauze, pp. 191 and 192.

See also
Coahuila
History of Mexico
Venustiano Carranza
Emilio Salinas

References 

Governors of Coahuila
Politicians from Coahuila
1846 births
1902 deaths
19th-century Mexican politicians